2090 Mizuho, provisional designation , is a stony asteroid from the outer region of the asteroid belt, approximately 18 kilometers in diameter.

The asteroid was discovered on 12 March 1978, by Japanese astronomer Takeshi Urata at the JCPM Yakiimo Station in Shimizu, Japan, who named it after his daughter, Mizuho Urata.

Orbit and classification 

Mizuho orbits the Sun in the outer main-belt at a distance of 2.7–3.5 AU once every 5 years and 5 months (1,967 days). Its orbit has an eccentricity of 0.13 and an inclination of 12° with respect to the ecliptic.

The first used observation was obtained at Heidelberg Observatory in 1951, extending the Mizuho observation arc by 27 years prior to its official discovery observation.

Physical characteristics 

In the Tholen classification, Mizuho is characterized as a common S-type asteroid.

Rotation period 

In February 2010, a rotational lightcurve for Mizuho was obtained from photometric observations by James W. Brinsfield at the Via Capote Observatory  in California. It gave a rotation period of 5.47 hours with a brightness variation of 0.30 magnitude.

Diameter and albedo 

According to the surveys carried out by the Japanese Akari satellite, and NASA's Wide-field Infrared Survey Explorer with its subsequent NEOWISE mission, Mizuho measures between 18.0 and 18.9 kilometers in diameter and its surface has an albedo of between 0.207 and 0.219, which is typical for stony asteroids. The Collaborative Asteroid Lightcurve Link, however assumes a standard albedo for a carbonaceous C-type asteroid of 0.057 and correspondingly calculates a much larger diameter of 35.3 kilometers.

Naming 

The discoverer named this minor planet after his daughter, Mizuho Urata. It was the first asteroid in over 50 years to be discovered by a non-professional astronomer, which set off a wave of interest in amateur asteroid discovery, especially in Japan. The official  was published by the Minor Planet Center on 1 September 1978.

References

External links 
 Asteroid Lightcurve Database (LCDB), query form (info )
 Dictionary of Minor Planet Names, Google books
 Asteroids and comets rotation curves, CdR – Observatoire de Geneve, Raoul Behrend
 Discovery Circumstances: Numbered Minor Planets (1)-(5000)  – Minor Planet Center
 
 

 

002090
Discoveries by Takeshi Urata
Named minor planets
002090
19780312